Iddo Porat is an associate professor of constitutional law at the College of Law and Business, Israel.

Biography
Porat was born in Ramat Gan and grew up in Ramat Hasharon. He studied at Thelma Yellin High School of Arts and majored in Music. He is the son of Colonel (retired) Yehuda Porat and Professor Dina Porat, is married to Natalie Steinberg-Porat and is the father of Yoav, Yael, Uri and Itay.

He received a BA degree in law and philosophy, cum laude, from the Hebrew University of Jerusalem and clerked at the Israel Supreme Court for Justice Dalia Dorner. For his graduate studies Porat studied at Stanford University where he received his LLB and JSD Degrees under the guidance of Professor Thomas Gray. His doctoral thesis was on Balancing Tests in American Constitutional Law.

On his return to Israel Porat joined the Faculty of Law at the College of Law and Business. During the year 2008-2009 he was a visiting professor at the University of San Diego School of Law, and since then he teaches there yearly a course in constitutional law.

Research

Porat's areas of research are constitutional law and philosophy of law. Among his subjects are: balancing and proportionality tests, global and comparative constitutional law, group rights, anti-discrimination law, Just War theory, and the history of constitutional law.

Books
In 2013 Porat published a book titled Proportionality and Constitutional Culture co-authored with Professor Moshe Cohen-Eliya.
The book deals with the worldwide expansion of the proportionality doctrine and argues that it should be attributed to a "culture of justification", namely a culture that requires from the state to justify its actions. The book situates the proportionality doctrine in a historical, cultural and political context and compares it with balancing in American law.

The authors maintain that in spite of the analytical similarity between proportionality and American balancing there exists a deep cultural and historical gap between the two doctrines, which influences the way in which the two doctrines are integrated in constitutional law and function in it.

Articles 

In several of his articles Porat analyzes the relationship between right and illicit motives and intentions. He argues that some of the most central constitutional rights are intended to uncover illicit motives and intentions by the state and prohibit them. As opposed to this, rights that do not protect against illicit motives are weaker and exposed to balancing, and might even belong outside the scope of constitutional lawaltogether.

Illicit intentions also guide Porat's attitudes towards the ethical wrongness of terror, and the distinction between terror and other violent acts.
In his articles on group rights Porat claims that a distinctionshould be made between defensivegroup rightsthat defend the group and its members against the pressures of the general society, andoffensive group rights, that are aimed at expanding the group and its claims vis avis the majority group. Offensive claims (as for example claims of Ultra-Orthodox Jews in Israel regarding observing Shabbat in the public sphere, or claims of the Arab minority in Israel to change Hebraic street names to Arabic ones) are as a rule less justifiable than defensive claims.

In his writing on Just War theory Porat defends the moral right of the state, under certain limitations, to give preference to the lives of its own citizens over the lives of foreign citizens and citizens of enemy countries.

References

Further reading
 Iddo Porat's Scholarly Papers, www.ssrn.com (ssrn). 
  Iddo Porat's web page, College of Law and Business, www.clb.ac.il.
 Iddo Porat's CV.

Living people
Hebrew University of Jerusalem alumni
Israeli legal scholars
People from Ramat Gan
Year of birth missing (living people)
Scholars of constitutional law